Jesse Margera (born August 28, 1978) is an American musician. He is best known as the drummer of the rock band CKY, which he co-founded in 1998. Prior to CKY, Margera performed in the band Foreign Objects with former CKY vocalist and guitarist Deron Miller, and he has since worked with Gnarkill, Viking Skull, The Company Band and Fuckface Unstoppable. Margera has also appeared in the CKY video series and the Viva La Bam and Jackass television series alongside his brother Bam.

Early life
Margera was born on August 28, 1978 and raised in West Chester, Pennsylvania. He is the older brother of professional skateboarder and TV personality Bam Margera,  alongside whom he is considered a founding member of the CKY crew, which worked on the video series of the same name. He chose to play the drums as he had two uncles who played the instrument, one of whom later worked as a drum technician on a CKY tour. His "biggest influence" was Led Zeppelin drummer John Bonham, but as a young musician he also took an interest in jazz drummers such as Elvin Jones.

Career

1993–2002: Foreign Objects, CKY and Gnarkill
Margera first played in a band in 1991 or 1992. One of his first bands was Soalroach, which featured brother Bam and friend Ryan Dunn. He later formed Foreign Objects with future CKY vocalist and guitarist Deron Miller, whom he originally met at high school. The band released its debut extended play (EP) The Undiscovered Numbers & Colors in 1995. Along with bassist Ryan Bruni, the duo later performed under the name Oil, before meeting guitarist Chad I Ginsburg (who was then working as an audio engineer) and changing the name of the band to CKY. Speaking about the formation of the band, Margera recalled in a 2003 interview that the main reason he joined CKY was Miller's guitar playing ability, particularly his ability to write "complicated [guitar] riffs that are catchy".

As a member of CKY, Margera performed drums on all five of the band's studio albums, and was credited for contributing to songwriting on Infiltrate•Destroy•Rebuild.

Margera was also member of the CKY-related comedy band Gnarkill, formed in 2002, alongside Brandon DiCamillo on vocals, guitarist Rich Vose and brother Bam on keyboards; he performed on both studio albums: 2002's Gnarkill and 2006's GnarKill vs. Unkle Matt and the ShitBirdz.

2002–2011: Viking Skull and The Company Band

In November 2006, it was announced that Margera had joined English band Viking Skull, replacing founding member Gordon Morrison. Speaking about his replacement of Morrison, Margera revealed that he unwittingly contributed to the temporary breakup of the band in 2006, after drinking heavily with the band on tour. The new lineup released the album Chapter Two in September 2007, which was mixed by CKY guitarist Chad I Ginsburg. Viking Skull and Ginsburg (this time as producer) worked together again for the follow-up album Doom, Gloom, Heartache & Whiskey, recorded and released in 2008 in the US. The CKY collaboration was extended further, as Joe Frantz and Margera's brother Bam directed the music video for the song "Hair of the Dog".

In addition to his work with CKY and Viking Skull, in 2007 Margera formed The Company Band, a supergroup featuring Clutch frontman Neil Fallon and Fireball Ministry frontman James Rota. Each of the bands had toured with one another between 2005 and 2006, after which the group began jamming together and eventually formed into an official band. With the addition of guitarist Dave Bone and bassist Jason Diamond, the band recorded its debut EP Sign Here, Here and Here with producer Andrew Alekel and released it later in the year. The band recorded its full-length debut in 2009, and released it in November that year as The Company Band. Another EP, Pros & Cons, was released in 2012.

2011–present: Fuckface Unstoppable and future
The fate of CKY was cast into doubt in 2011, when the band released a video in which each member spoke about their desires for the future of the band; all members but Ginsburg wanted to record solo albums, while the guitarist favored releasing another CKY album. Miller later claimed that Ginsburg had left the band, while Margera tried to calm the situation by suggesting that Miller had problems with alcohol abuse, and that he needed "support ... not insult[s]". Margera, along with Ginsburg and bassist Matt "Matty J" Janaitis, later returned as CKY in 2012 with Year Long Disaster frontman Daniel Davies in place of Miller. This lineup (with Matt Deis in place of Janaitis) later reunited in 2015, following another split with Miller. Margera has claimed that Davies offered to join the band during a phone call with the drummer, after he had performed on the singer's solo album.

Margera also performs drums in brother Bam's group Fuckface Unstoppable, and has contributed to both studio albums: Stórfréttir Í Reykjavík and Fuckface Unstoppable.

On June 16, 2017, the fifth CKY album titled The Phoenix was released.

Jess and Ginsburg are currently working on a new CKY album.

Discography

with Foreign Objects
The Undiscovered Numbers & Colors (1995)
Universal Culture Shock (2004)
with CKY
Volume 1 (1999)
Infiltrate•Destroy•Rebuild (2002)
An Answer Can Be Found (2005)
Carver City (2009)
The Phoenix (2017)
Too Precious to Kill (2018)
with Gnarkill
Gnarkill (2002)
GnarKill vs. Unkle Matt and the ShitBirdz (2006)

with Viking Skull
Chapter Two (2007)
Blackened Sunrise (2007)
Doom, Gloom, Heartache & Whiskey (2008)
Cursed By the Sword (2012)
Live at Voodoo Lounge (2014)
Viking Skull (2016)
with The Company Band
Sign Here, Here and Here (2007)
The Company Band (2009)
Pros & Cons (2012)
with Fuckface Unstoppable
Stórfréttir Í Reykjavík (2013)
Fuckface Unstoppable (2014)
with The Evesdroppers 
The Evesdroppers (2016)

Filmography

Films

Television

References

External links

1978 births
Living people
CKY (band) members
People from West Chester, Pennsylvania
American heavy metal drummers
Male actors from Pennsylvania
Songwriters from Pennsylvania
Place of birth missing (living people)
20th-century American drummers
American male drummers
21st-century American drummers
20th-century American male musicians
21st-century American male musicians
American male songwriters
CKY
Jackass (TV series)